Matt Stewart (born August 31, 1979) is a former American football linebacker and long snapper. He was drafted by the Atlanta Falcons in the fourth round of the 2001 NFL Draft. He played college football at Vanderbilt.

Stewart has also been a member of the Cleveland Browns, Arizona Cardinals, Dallas Cowboys, and Pittsburgh Steelers.

Early years
He was born in 1979 to Van and Mimi Stewart in Columbus, Ohio. He played for St. Francis DeSales High School.

College career
He totaled 269 tackles and 15 sacks in the 44 games he played in at Vanderbilt University. He earned a bachelor's degree in Mechanical Engineering.

Professional career

Atlanta Falcons
Stewart was selected by the Atlanta Falcons in the fourth round (102nd overall) in the 2001 NFL Draft. In his rookie season he played in 15 games and finished the season with 16 tackles. In the 2002 season, he played in all 16 games starting 13 of them, he finished the season with 87 tackles.

Cleveland Browns
Stewart signed with the Cleveland Browns as a free agent in 2005. He appeared in 30 games (16 starts) for the team over the next two seasons, recording 59 tackles (44 solo), one sack, one interception and two passes defensed. He missed the entire 2007 season on injured reserve with a torn shoulder muscle before becoming a free agent in 2008.

Arizona Cardinals
On April 16, 2008, Stewart signed a one-year contract with the Arizona Cardinals. He was later released on August 30, 2008 during final cuts.

Dallas Cowboys
On March 3, 2009 Stewart agreed to terms on a one-year contract with the Cowboys reuniting him with Head Coach Wade Phillips and linebacker Keith Brooking who were also both members of the Atlanta Falcons.  However, he did not make the final roster for the 2009 season.

Pittsburgh Steelers
On June 7, 2010, it was reported that the Pittsburgh Steelers had signed Stewart as a long snapper. He was released on July 30, 2010. On August 23, 2010, the Steelers re-signed Stewart to a one-year deal. He was again released on September 4, 2010.

NFL Stats

References

External links
Arizona Cardinals bio
Cleveland Browns bio

1979 births
Living people
Players of American football from Columbus, Ohio
American football linebackers
Vanderbilt Commodores football players
Atlanta Falcons players
Cleveland Browns players
Arizona Cardinals players
Dallas Cowboys players